The New Zealand cricket team toured Zimbabwe for a two-match Test series and a two-match One Day International (ODI) series between 31 October and 12 November 1992. New Zealand won the Test series, which was the first played between the two teams, 1–0 and the ODI series 2–0. The second ODI was played on the rest day during the second Test.

Test series

1st Test

2nd Test

ODI series

1st ODI

2nd ODI

References

External links
 

1992 in New Zealand cricket
1992 in Zimbabwean cricket
International cricket competitions from 1991–92 to 1994
1992-93
Zimbabwean cricket seasons from 1980–81 to 1999–2000